Gustave Moynier (21 September 1826 – 21 August 1910) was a Swiss Jurist who was active in many charitable organizations in Geneva.

He was a co-founder of the "International Committee for Relief to the Wounded", which became the International Committee of the Red Cross after 1876. In 1864 he took over the position of President of the Committee from Guillaume-Henri Dufour, and he was also a major rival of the founder Henry Dunant. During his record long term of 46 years as president he did much to support the development of the Committee in the first decades after its creation.

Background 
Moynier came from a rich and established Geneva family of merchants and bankers. He studied law in Paris and received his doctorate in 1850. Because of his Calvinist persuasion, he became interested in charity work and social problems early on. In 1859 he took over the chairmanship of the Geneva Society for Public
Welfare. He was also active in around forty additional charitable organizations and groups involved in tasks from improving the conditions for prison inmates to caring for orphans.

In 1862 Dunant sent him a copy of his book A Memory of Solferino. Moynier showed great interest in the realization of Dunant's ideas for the creation of a voluntary care organization for the assistance of the wounded in battle and opened a discussion about the book at the assembly of the Geneva Society for Public Welfare. This led to the creation of the "Committee of Five," a commission of the Society set up to investigate the plausibility of Dunant's ideas. The additional members of the Commission, with Moynier as chairman, were Dunant, the doctors Louis Appia and Théodore Maunoir and the army general Guillaume-Henri Dufour. Soon afterwards, the members of the Committee changed the name to the "International Committee for Relief to the Wounded" and in 1876 it adopted its current name, the International Committee of the Red Cross (ICRC). Dufour became the first president of the Committee, and Moynier became its vice-president.

Term as President of the ICRC 

Differences between Moynier and Dunant developed early over the reach of the organization's authority and its legal and organizational formation. The key point of dispute was Dunant's idea to grant neutrality to wounded soldiers and medical staff in order to protect them. Moynier was a determined opponent of this plan, which he did not consider realistic and thought its insistence risked the collapse of the project. Dunant, however, was able to persuade powerful political and military figures in Europe of his ideas, and with the first Geneva Convention in 1864 had some success toward their implementation. In that same year however, Moynier took over the position of President of the International Committee.

The increasing tensions between the pragmatist Moynier and the idealist Dunant led to Dunant's expulsion, led by Moynier, after Dunant's bankruptcy in 1867. While not proven, it is probable that Moynier used his influence to prevent Dunant, who from then on lived in rather poor conditions, from receiving financial assistance from his various supporters in Europe. For example, the gold medal of the Sciences Morales at the Paris World's Fair in 1867 was not awarded to Dunant but divided between Dunant, Moynier, and Dufour. The prize money was also not awarded to Dunant but given to the International Committee itself. An offer from Napoleon III to settle half of Dunant's debt if the other half would be taken over by Dunant's friends was thwarted by Moynier's efforts.

In 1872 Moynier submitted, after the Franco-Prussian War in 1870-71, a proposal for the creation of an international arbitration court to penalize violations of International Humanitarian Law. Because of concerns by most national governments over state sovereignty, the measure was not adopted. Moynier was nominated for the Nobel Peace Prize in 1901, 1902, 1903, and 1905 by Richard Kleen, a member of the Institut de droit international (Institute of International Law). However, unlike Dunant who was awarded the first Nobel Peace Prize in 1901 together with Frédéric Passy, Moynier never received the prize. He died in 1910 two months before Dunant, without any sort of reconciliation between the two. Having been President of the Committee until his death, he was the Committee's longest-serving President in its history.

Legacy
The Rue Gustave-Moynier, in Secheron, Geneva's diplomatic quarter,  is named after him and part of the nearby Parc Mon Repos is known as the Parc Moynier.

There is a statue of Moynier in the Parc des Bastions, next to the University of Geneva.

References 
 Originally translated from the German Wikipedia
 Pierre Boissier: History of the International Committee of the Red Cross. Volume I: From Solferino to Tsushima. Henry Dunant Institute, Geneva 1985, 
 Caroline Moorehead: Dunant's dream: War, Switzerland and the history of the Red Cross. HarperCollins, London 1998,  (Hardcover edition); HarperCollins, London 1999,  (Paperback edition)
 André Durand: Gustave Moynier and the peace societies. In: International Review of the Red Cross. 314/1996. ICRC, S. 532-550, ISSN 1560-7755
 André Durand: The first Nobel Prize (1901) Henry Dunant, Gustave Moynier and the International Committee of the Red Cross as candidates. In: International Review of the Red Cross. 842/2001. ICRC, S. 275-285, ISSN 1560-7755
 Jean de Senarclens: Gustave Moynier: le bâtisseur. Editions Slatkine, Geneva 2000,

External links 

 Red Cross and Red Crescent Movement History - Gustave Moynier biography 

1826 births
1910 deaths
Members of the Institut de Droit International
Lawyers from Geneva
Red Cross personnel